Colotis protractus, The Blue Spotted Arab, is a butterfly in the family Pieridae. It is found in North West India, Punjab and Balochistan.

Subspecies
Colotis protractus protractus
Colotis protractus semiramis Grum-Grshimailo, 1902

References

Butterflies described in 1876
protractus
Butterflies of Asia
Taxa named by Arthur Gardiner Butler